The Canton of Combourg is a canton of France, in the Ille-et-Vilaine département, located in the northwest of the department. At the French canton reorganisation which came into effect in March 2015, the canton was expanded from 10 to 26 communes (3 of which were merged into the new commune Mesnil-Roc'h).

It consists of the following communes: 
 
La Baussaine 
Bonnemain
Cardroc
La Chapelle-aux-Filtzméens
Combourg
Cuguen
Dingé
Les Iffs
Lanrigan
Longaulnay
Lourmais
Meillac
Mesnil-Roc'h
Plesder
Pleugueneuc
Québriac
Saint-Brieuc-des-Iffs  
Saint-Domineuc
Saint-Léger-des-Prés
Saint-Thual
Tinténiac
Trémeheuc
Trévérien
Trimer

References

Cantons of Ille-et-Vilaine